The Liberation of Korytsa by the Hellenic armed forces, happened on 20 December 1912, during the First Balkan War.

Capture
During the early stages of the war while the Balkan allies were victorious, the Hellenic Army liberated Thessaloniki and continued to advance west in Macedonia to Kastoria and then Korytsa.

The Epirus front was also active and the Ottoman forces under Djavid Pasha placed 24,000 Ottoman troops in Korytsa in order to protect north of Ioannina, the urban center of the Epirus region. On December 20, three days after peace negotiations started, the Greek forces pushed the Ottomans out of Korytsa.

This would give the Greek forces a significant advantage in controlling Ioannina and the entire area in March 1913 at the Battle of Bizani.

After Ioannina was captured, the town was visited on 17 May, 1913, by Prince George (later George II of Greece). Prince George was welcomed by the Muslim mayor of the town and he visited a Dervish monastery nearby.

Citations

References

 
 
 

Battles of the First Balkan War
Conflicts in 1912
1912 in the Ottoman Empire
1912 in Albania
Capture
Battles involving Greece
Battles involving the Ottoman Empire
Military history of Albania
History of Korçë County
Modern history of Epirus
Manastir vilayet
December 1912 events